The 1920 United States presidential election in Mississippi took place on November 2, 1920, as part of the 1920 United States presidential election which was held throughout all contemporary 48 states. Voters chose 10 representatives, or electors to the Electoral College, who voted for president and vice president. In Mississippi, voters voted for electors individually instead of as a slate, as in the other states.

Mississippi voted for the Democratic nominee, Governor James M. Cox of Ohio, over Republican nominee, Senator Warren G. Harding of Ohio. Cox ran with Assistant Secretary of the Navy Franklin D. Roosevelt of New York, while Harding ran with Governor Calvin Coolidge of Massachusetts.

Cox won Mississippi by a landslide margin of 69.95%.

Results

References

Mississippi
1920
1920 Mississippi elections